Sandhole Colliery (or Bridgewater Colliery) was a coal mine originally owned by the Bridgewater Trustees operating on the Manchester Coalfield in Walkden, Greater Manchester, then in the historic county of Lancashire, England. The colliery closed in 1962.

History
The Bridgewater Trustees began sinking two  diameter shafts for the Bridgewater Colliery in 1865. The winding house contained two engines built by Naysmyth, Wilson & Company. The engines survived until 1962 when the colliery closed. No 3 shaft was 

References
Notes

Bibliography

Coal mines in Lancashire
Mining in Lancashire
Underground mines in England